Melanophloea is a genus of lichenized fungi in the division Ascomycota. , it had not been placed into a specific family, class or class, and its relationship to other Ascomycota genera remains uncertain. It is a monotypic genus, containing the single species Melanophloea pacifica. Other species formerly assigned to this genus have been reassigned elsewhere.

References

External links
Index Fungorum

Ascomycota enigmatic taxa
Lichen genera
Taxa named by Antonín Vězda